Guinness World Records Primetime (AKA Guinness Primetime) is a TV show based on the Guinness World Records, and aired on the Fox television network from July 27, 1998, to October 4, 2001. It was hosted by Cris Collinsworth and Mark Thompson and reported on existing record-holders or on new record attempts.

These new record attempts included many unusual or bizarre categories such as a 300-pound tumor, squirting milk from one's eye, covering one's self with bees, sitting in a tub of snakes, regurgitating, burping, setting one's self on fire, eating metal, worms, and ketchup, kissing cobras, acting as a human speed bump, and entering a coffin full of cockroaches.  Most of these attempts never found their way into the Guinness Book.

See also
Guinness World Records Gone Wild

External links 
 

Fox Broadcasting Company original programming
1998 American television series debuts
2001 American television series endings
Guinness World Records